Wood Wood is a town located in the local government area of the Rural City of Swan Hill, Victoria, Australia. A caravan park, 'Riverhaven Caravan Park' offers accommodation for travellers and tourists to the area.

Business 
Wood Wood Post Office opened on 17 December 1900 and was closed on 30 June 1987.

See also 
 List of reduplicated Australian place names

References

External links 

Towns in Victoria (Australia)
Rural City of Swan Hill